The Sobolev Institute of Mathematics (SIM) was founded in 1957 by Sergey Sobolev. It is located in Akademgorodok and it constitutes part of the Siberian Branch of the Russian Academy of Sciences. Sergey S. Goncharov is the director.

The institute was founded as part of a broader project developed by Sobolev, Mikhail Lavrentyev and Sergey Khristianovich which received official support on 18 May 1957. The broader project led to the foundation of the Novosibirsk State University and the town of Akademgorodok. However SIM was one of the first academic institutes to be set up being founded in 1957.

Journals
 Algebra and logic Editor: Yuri L. Ershov
 Siberian Mathematical Journal Editor-in-Chief: Yuri L. Ershov
 Siberian Advances in Mathematics Editor-in-Chief: Alexander A. Borovkov
 Matematicheskie Trudy (Mathematical Proceedings) Editor-in-chief: Alexander A. Borovkov
 Journal of Applied and Industrial Mathematics Editor-in-Chief: Vladimir G. Romanov
Siberian Electronic Mathematical Reports Editor-in-Chief: Andrei Yu. Vesnin

Official website
Official website

References

Research institutes in Novosibirsk
1957 establishments in the Soviet Union
Research institutes established in 1957
Research institutes in the Soviet Union